Dorin Toma (born 4 March 1977 in Şomcuta Mare, Maramureș County) is a Romanian former footballer and current manager. In the summer of 2005, Toma helped CFR Cluj reach the 2005 Intertoto Cup final by scoring one goal in 6 matches in the campaign.

Honours
CFR Cluj
Divizia B: 2003–04
UEFA Intertoto Cup runner-up: 2005
FCMU Baia Mare
Divizia C: 2010–11

Notes

References

External links

1977 births
Living people
People from Maramureș County
Romanian footballers
Association football defenders
Liga I players
Liga II players
Liga III players
CS Minaur Baia Mare (football) players
CFR Cluj players
FC Unirea Dej players
ACF Gloria Bistrița players
Romanian football managers
CS Minaur Baia Mare (football) managers
SSU Politehnica Timișoara managers